Michael Röckner is a mathematician working in the fields of Stochastic analysis and Mathematical Physics.

He obtained his PhD at the University of Bielefeld in 1984 under the supervision of Sergio Albeverio and Christopher John Preston.

Together with Claudia Prévôt, he wrote the book A Concise Course on Stochastic Partial Differential Equations.

References

Living people
20th-century German mathematicians
Probability theorists
Year of birth missing (living people)
21st-century German mathematicians
Sir Edmund Whittaker Memorial Prize winners
Presidents of the German Mathematical Society